The women's 400 metres hurdles event at the 1986 Commonwealth Games was held on 27 and 28 July at the Meadowbank Stadium in Edinburgh.

Medalists

Results

Heats
Qualification: First 3 of each heat (Q) and the next 2 fastest (q) qualified for the final.

Final

References

Athletics at the 1986 Commonwealth Games
1986